The 2014–15 EPIHL was the 18th season of the English Premier Ice Hockey League, the sport's third tier. A total of 9 teams participated.

There is no automatic promotion to the  British National League from the English League.

Peterborough Phantoms won the championship.

Final League Standings

English Premier Ice Hockey League

Playoffs

Leading Scorers

External links
Official EPIHL website
HockeyArchives.info
EliteProspects.com

2014–15 in English ice hockey
2014–15 in European second tier ice hockey leagues